Antoniel dos Santos França (born April 14, 1979 in Timon), known as Niel, is a Brazilian footballer who plays as right back.

Career statistics

Honours 
Flamengo do Piauí
 Campeonato Piauiense: 2003, 2009
 Copa Piauí: 2009

Cuiabá
 Campeonato Mato-Grossense: 2013

References

External links

1979 births
Living people
Brazilian footballers
Association football defenders
Campeonato Brasileiro Série B players
Campeonato Brasileiro Série C players
Campeonato Brasileiro Série D players
Esporte Clube Flamengo players
Sociedade Esportiva Tiradentes players
River Atlético Clube players
América Futebol Clube (RN) players
Associação Cultural e Desportiva Potiguar players
Ceará Sporting Club players
Barras Futebol Club players
Esporte Clube Democrata players
4 de Julho Esporte Clube players
Sociedade Esportiva Picos players
Mogi Mirim Esporte Clube players
Treze Futebol Clube players
Agremiação Sportiva Arapiraquense players
Cuiabá Esporte Clube players
Parnahyba Sport Club players